Esteban José Bullrich (born 26 May 1969, Buenos Aires) is an Argentine politician. A member of Republican Proposal (PRO), he served as a National Senator for Buenos Aires Province from 2017 to 2021, and as Minister of Education from 2015 to 2017, during the presidency of Mauricio Macri. Prior to that, he served as education minister of the Autonomous City of Buenos Aires, also under Macri, and as a National Deputy from 2005 to 2010.

He resigned from his seat in the Senate in 2021 due to the worsening of his amyotrophic lateral sclerosis. His vacancy was filled by José Torello.

Early life and education
Bullrich was born and raised in the city of Buenos Aires. After completing his bachelor's degree, Bullrich began his graduate studies in the United States at the Kellogg School of Management of Northwestern University in Evanston, Illinois. He was just 24 years old when he entered the program. At Kellogg he focused on human relations and organizational studies. After receiving his MBA Bullrich spent two months teaching mathematics to orphans in Nicaragua through the Padre Fabretto Foundation; he writes on his blog estebanbullrich.com that this experience "left a profound effect on me with regards to how a good education can help a child develop and achieve a more prosperous adult life" [quote translated from Spanish].

Political career
Bullrich began his political career in 2003 when he ran for a seat in the Buenos Aires City Legislature for the Recreate for Growth party (Recrear), later becoming vice-president of the party for the Buenos Aires District. In office, he has organized and led efforts to improve the Argentine education system.  In 2005, he was elected to the National Chamber of Deputies, representing the Autonomous City of Buenos Aires. Bullrich caucused with the PRO alliance, a center-right political bloc. Bullrich and PRO are also allied with political blocs Commitment to Change and Recrear.

In 2006 Bullrich was recognized as an Eisenhower Fellow in its Multi Nation Program 2006. This experience enabled him to meet American policy makers and study the US educational system with special attention on charter schools.

Bullrich has been in the press serving as an opposition congressman in the Skanska corruption case where the Swedish construction and development company allegedly over-charged the Argentine government for the construction of a pipeline in northern Argentina.

In 2007, Bullrich took leave from the chamber of deputies to become interim Minister of Social Development of the Autonomous City of Buenos Aires. He officially resigned to the chamber of deputies in 2009, a few months before the end his term.

On December 22, 2009, after the resignation of Abel Posse, it was announced that Bullrich would become Minister of Education of the Autonomous City of Buenos Aires. He took office on January 5, 2010. During his tenure, he reduced subsidies to private schools to increase teacher salaries in public schools by around 29% and closed 221 classes in order to merge them and decrease inefficiencies. During his administration launched the Sarmiento Plan, in order to give laptops to students and teachers.

Minister of Education
Mauricio Macri became president in 2015, and announced that he would be his minister of education. His mandate ended in 2017, after he became a senator. He was replaced by Alejandro Finocchiaro.

As a senator, he opposed the national campaign for legal, safe and free abortion in 2018, stating religious arguments to do so.

References

Argentine ministers of education
Living people
People with motor neuron disease
Politicians from Buenos Aires
Argentine people of German descent
Members of the Argentine Senate for Buenos Aires Province
Members of the Argentine Chamber of Deputies elected in Buenos Aires
1969 births
Kellogg School of Management alumni
Republican Proposal politicians
Recreate for Growth politicians